Branislav "Brana" Petronijević (sometimes styled as Petronievics) (Serbian Cyrillic: Бранислав "Брана" Петронијевић; 6 April 1875 – 4 March 1954) was a Serbian philosopher and paleontologist.

His major work is the two-volume Prinzipien der Metaphysik (Principles of Metaphysics, Heidelberg, 1904–1911), in which he outlines his original metaphysical system – a synthesis of Baruch Spinoza's monism and Gottfried Leibniz's monadological pluralism into what he called "monopluralism". Influenced by George Berkeley and G.W.F. Hegel, Petronijević held that our immediate experience is the source of basic logical and metaphysical axioms – what he called "empirio-rationalist" epistemology.

In the field of palaeontology, Petronijević was the first to distinguish between the genera Archaeopteryx and Archaeornis. However, most of his taxonomic interpretations were later abandoned. He also discovered new characteristics of the genera Tritylodon and Moeritherium.

Biography

Early life
Branislav Petronijević was born in the small village of Sovljak, near Ub, Serbia, on 6 April (25 March, O.S.) 1875, the son of a Marko Jeremić, a theologian. The last name Petronijević stems from Branislav's grandfather, Petronije Jeremić, a local priest. His father changed Branislav's last name to reduce pressure at school, as the Jeremić family were prominent supporters of the exiled Karađorđević dynasty.

He studied at the Valjevo Gymnasium and the Grande école in Belgrade (the Belgrade Higher School).

Education and early work
In 1894, Petronijević went to Vienna to pursue a degree in medicine, on a scholarship awarded by the Tamnava srez. Petronijević joined the Philosophical Society of the University of Vienna and studied under Ludwig Boltzmann. After three semesters in Vienna he enrolled at the University of Leipzig, where he studied philosophy under Johannes Volkelt, Wilhelm Ostwald, and Ernst Mach. There, he wrote Der ontologische Beweis für das Dasein des Absoluten (The Ontological Proof for the Existence of the Absolute) in 1897, and successfully defended his thesis Der Satz vom Grunde (The Principle of Reason) in 1898. Having studied during this time under Wilhelm Wundt, Petronijević later published several works in experimental psychology on the observation of the transparent and on the depth and observation of compound colours. In Leipzig, Petronijević received financial help from former bishop Nikanor Ružičić, with whom he practiced the German language.

In 1898 he was given the title of docent at the Belgrade Higher School at the request of professor Ljubomir Nedić. He taught the German language and philosophical propaedeutics at the Third Belgrade Gymnasium. Petronijević was promoted to the post of associate professor in 1899, and then full professor in 1903. Three years later when the school developed into the University of Belgrade, Petronijević was demoted back to associate professor. He was simultaneously elected correspondent member of the Serbian Royal Academy on 3 February 1906. Petronijević found this humiliating, and declined the post, his decision coming into effect in 1910. During this time, Petronijević also taught art theory at Rista and Beta Vukanović's Serbian Art School in Belgrade.

It was during this period that he thought out and developed what is distinctive in his philosophical doctrine. His two major works in metaphysics, Prinzipen der Metaphysik (Principles of Metaphysics) and Die typischen Geometrien und das Unendliche (The Typical Geometries and the Infinite), were published during this period.

World War I
At the outbreak of World War I he turned to journalism, becoming a war correspondent for the Serbian War Office Press Bureau, induced by Dragutin Dimitrijević "Apis", his childhood friend. In 1915 he joined the Serbian army's retreat through Albania. After reaching Greece, he was sent first to Rome where he stayed for four months. After Rome, Petronijević spent several months in Paris, where he taught two courses at the Sorbonne, on universal evolution and on the value of life.

Finally, he spent the longest part of the war in London with the Serbian Legation, along with politician Nikola Pašić, geographer Jovan Cvijić, professors Bogdan Popović and his brother Pavle Popović. There, Petronijević worked on an English translation of Theoria Philosophiæ Naturalis (A Theory of Natural Philosophy) by Roger Joseph Boscovich, together with Čedomilj Mijatović and Nikolaj Velimirović. The 1763 Venetian edition of the book was translated by James Mark Child, and finally published in 1922 by the Open Court Publishing Company, funded in part by the newly created Kingdom of Serbs, Croats and Slovenes. Petronijević wrote the preface, titled Life of Roger Joseph Boscovich. Parts of it were severely criticized by Vladimir Varićak in 1925 for various factual errors, among other things for asserting Boscovich's exclusively Serbian ethnicity, and listing his birth date inaccurately.

While in London, Petronijević met with Bertrand Russell, who wrote:

Later life
After the war he left London and went back to his teaching post at the University of Belgrade, where he was appointed again appointed full professor in 1919. On 16 February 1920, he was elected into the Serbian Royal Academy.

From 1918 to 1922, Petronijević notably mentored Ksenija Atanasijević, later a prominent Serbian female intellectual and early Serbian feminist writer.

During the Interbellum, Petronijević was an active participant in European philosophy, and considered himself a worthy philosopher who transcended his "parochial" limitations. He deemed himself one of the 15 "great philosophers" of history, along with Aristotle, Leibniz and Hegel. Beside "great philosophers", Petronijević mentions "significant philosophers" and "philosophic writers".

Petronijević retired from the university in 1927. He served as secretary of the Serbian Royal Academy from February 1932 to February 1933 and founded the Serbian Philosophical Society in 1938, together with Vladimir Dvorniković, Justin Popović and others. The third volume of his Principles of Metaphysics was destroyed in an air raid in April 1941. He held lectures at the German Scientific Institute during the occupation of Yugoslavia. After the war, he traveled to France several times and started writing poetry. Petronijević was nominated for the Nobel Prize in Literature in 1941 and 1947.

Petronijević died in a Belgrade's Hotel Balkan on 4 March 1954. He was 78. He never married.

Writings

Philosophy
Petronijević considered himself a "born metaphysician" and devoted himself to constructing his own metaphysical system. Although original, his system grew out of the nineteenth-century empirical metaphysics of Hermann Lotze, Eduard von Hartmann and Petronijević's teacher, Johannes Volkelt.

The motto of Petronijević's principal work Prinzipien der Metaphysik (Principles of Metaphysics, 1904), reads: "Exact mathematical notions are a key to the solution of the world's enigma". In it, he constructed a new geometry in which time and space are discrete, not continuous. Petronijević argued that being consists of simple, discrete qualitative points which are mutually related in various ways to form a unity. He outlined two types of these simple points – real "central points" (Mittelpunkte) and unreal "intermediate points" (Zwischenpunkte). The world as a manifold is possible only because each pair of real points of being is separated by an unreal point constituting an "act of negation", without which being would be absolutely homogeneous. Petronijević regarded the principle of negation as "the absolute principle of the world". His metaphysical system was thus conceived as a synthesis of Baruch Spinoza's monism and Gottfried Leibniz's monadological pluralism into what he called "monopluralism".

He claimed that the basic task of metaphysics was to explain the structure of the "world of multitude, diversity, and change" as the "pre-evidence" of the directly given empirical and transcendental reality. Petronijević's view was essentially idealistic, since he held that absolutely unconscious atoms are impossible and that the immortal soul is a conscious monad. He argued that the universe was evolving from a condition of instability towards one of absolute stability, in which there would be equilibrium in the relation between particular elements or monads and the universal substance which underlies them. This last is the subject of a special division of philosophy, beyond metaphysics, which Petronijević called "hypermetaphysics".

His original "empirio-rationalist" epistemology was based on a rather complex derivation of logical laws from immediate experience. For Petronijević, our immediate experience not only presents reality as is, but is also the source of basic logical and metaphysical axioms – all are derived from the data of immediate experience. Petronijević rejected Immanuel Kant’s phenomenalism and denied the distinction between the phenomenal and noumenal. He held that the all contents of the mind are real and thus denied the existence of pure representation, claiming that all representations are in fact real. For Petronijević, thought and being are identical, and apodictic knowledge of being itself is possible. He considered the principle of sufficient reason the fundamental law of true knowledge.

Petronijević upheld an ethical theory of transcendental optimism and free will. He argued that "it is not possible to live with the belief that there is no free will". Since Petronijević's epistemology does not allow for the existence of an absolute illusion, the subjective experience of free will implies its existence in reality. He devoted a number of studies to aesthetics, particularly in the work of Petar II Petrović Njegoš and Leo Tolstoy.

Natural science

From 1917, Petronijević analyzed the Berlin specimen of the Archaeopteryx.

In 1921, discovered the pelvis of the Berlin specimen was markedly different from that of the London specimen. Namely, the Berlin specimen entirely lacked a pubic symphysis. Petronijević erected the genus Archaeornis and was in favor of assigning a new species to the Berlin specimen, Archaeornis siemensii, after the fossil's generous donor Werner von Siemens. Gavin de Beer, however, disputed this difference, claiming it could be entirely accounted for by deformation of the specimens during preservation, a conclusion generally accepted by later paleontologists.

In 1925, Petronijević attempted to reconstruct the sternum as being keeled. The sternum identified in the London specimen, by contrast, appeared unkeeled and this discrepancy, too, led Petronijević to classify the Berlin specimen as a different genus, Archaeornis. Wellnhofer (1993) and Tischlinger & Unwin (2004) identified the triangular structure as indeed part of the sternum, albeit minimally ossified (mostly cartilagenous). This supported the idea that the Berlin Archaeopteryx was not a full-grown individual at the time of its death, and instead represents an immature animal.

After the extensive examination of five newly discovered early bird specimens all of his taxonomic interpretations were abandoned, and only his discoveries of the Archaeopteryx skeleton parts remained.

In 1923, Petronijević added a new species, M. ancestrale to the genus Moeritherium, excluding a skull and a mandible from those attributed to M. lyonsi on the basis of some cranial characters observed on the palatine and occipital. In his revision of the genus,  considered the skull differences mentioned by Petronijević as intraspecific and sex-related variations and synonymised M. gracile, M. lyonsi and M. ancestrale, keeping only one species for the Qasr el Sagha Formation under the name M. lyonsi.

Petronijević's contributions to the philosophy of natural sciences are collected in his compilation L'évolution universelle. Exposé des preuves et des lois de l`évolution mondiale et des évolutions particulières (Universal evolution. Presentation of Evidence and Laws of Global Evolution and Particular Developments, 1921). Among them there are the explanation of Dollo's law of irreversibility, first described in Zakon nepovratne evolucije (Law of Irreversible Evolution, 1920), and the introduction of his own Law of Non-correlative Evolution with which he describes the mosaic evolution in Archaeopteryx.

Among his most notable contributions to the logical foundations of mathematics are his work on typical geometries, on the problem of the infinitude of space, the three-body problem, on difference quotients, and on mathematical induction. In psychology, he developed theories about the observation of the transparent and on the depth and observation of compound colours.

Legacy

In 1957, the Department of Natural Science of the Serbian Academy of Sciences and Arts published a commemorative anthology of all Petronijević's publications. He was included in the 1993 book The 100 most prominent Serbs, published by the Serbian Academy of Sciences and Arts. A street in the Višnjička Banja neighborhood of Belgrade is named in his honor.

According to Miodrag Cekić, Petronijević's works in philosophy may have influenced Boltzmann's late system of philosophical classification. His theory of multi-dimensions as well as the theory of mathematical discontinuity also seems to have interested both Boltzmann and Mach.

Bibliography

Works by Petronijević in English:
 Life of Roger Joseph Boscovich (preface to A Theory of Natural Philosophy by Roger Joseph Boscovich), Open Court Publishing Company, 1922.

Works by Petronijević in German:

 Der ontologische Beweis für das Dasein des Absoluten. Versuch einer Neubegründung mit besonderer Rücksicht auf das erkenntnistheoretische Grundproblem Leipzig : H. Haacke, 1897. (The Ontological Proof for the Existence of the Absolute. Attempt at a New Foundation with Special Regard to the Basic Problem of Epistemology)
 Der Satz vom Grunde. eine logische Untersuchung. Belgrade : Staatsdruckerei, 1898. (The Principle of Reason. A Logical Investigation)
 Prinzipien der Erkenntnislehre. Prolegomena zur absoluten Metaphysik. Berlin : Ernst Hoffmann & Co, 1900. (Principles of Epistemology. Prolegomena to Absolute Metaphysics)
 Prinzipien der Metaphysik. 2 vols. Heidelberg : Carl Winter's Universitätsbuchhandlung, 1904–1911. (Principles of Metaphysics)
 Die typischen Geometrien und das Unendliche. Heidelberg : C. Winter, 1907. (The Typical Geometries and the Infinite)
 Über den Begriff der zusammengesetzten Farbe. Leipzig : Barth, 1908. (On the Concept of Compound Colors)
 Über Herbarts Lehre von intelligiblem Raume. Berlin : Leonhard Simion, 1914. (On Herbart's Theory of Intelligible Spaces)
 Über das Becken, den Schultergürtel und einige andere Teile der Londoner Archaeopteryx. Genf : George, 1921. (On the Pelvis, the Shoulder Girdle and Some Other Parts of the London Archaeopteryx)

Works by Petronijević in French:

 L'évolution universelle. Exposé des preuves et des lois de l`évolution mondiale et des évolutions particulières (inorganique, organique, intellectuelle et sociale). Paris : F. Alcan, 1921. (Universal Evolution. Presentation of the Evidence and Laws of Global Evolution and Particular Developments (Inorganic, Organic, Intellectual and Social))
 Sur la valeur de la vie. Paris : F. Alcan, 1925. (On the Value of Life)
 Résumé des travaux philosophiques et scientifiques de Branislav Petroniević. Academie Royal Serbe, Bulletin de l'Academie des Lettres, No. 2. Belgrade, 1937.

Works by Petronijević in Serbian on Schopenhauer, Nietzsche, Spinoza, Leibniz, Spencer, and Hegel.

 Спиритизам. Београд, 1900. стр. 74
 Фридрих Ниче. Н. Сад, 1902. стр. 99
 О слободи воље, моралној и кривичној одговорности. Београд, 1906. стр. 178+1
 Едуард Хартман. Живот и филозофија. Београд, 1907. стр. 43
 Филозофија у „Горском Вијенцу“ Н. Сад, 1908. стр. 60
 Основи емпириске психологије. Београд, 1910. стр. 318
 Чланци и студије. Књ. -{I-III}-. Београд, 1913-22.
 Шопенхауер, Ниче и Спенсер. Београд, 1922. стр. 316
 Историја новије филозофије. -{I}- део од Ренесансе до Канта. Београд, 1922. стр. 389
 Основи емпириске психологије. -{II}- изд. Књ. -{I-III}-. Београд, 1923-6. стр. 12+172
 Основи теорије сазнања са 19 сл. у тексту. Београд, 1923. стр. 187
 Хегел и Хартман. Београд, 1924. стр. 151
 Чланци и студије. Нова серија. Београд, 1932. стр. 1932
 Принципи метафизике - I, II, Београд, 1998.

See also
 Ljubomir Nedić
 Ksenija Atanasijević
 Milan Kujundžić Aberdar
 Petar II Petrović Njegoš

References

 Šešić, B., "Petronijević, Branislav" in Brochert, D. M. (ed.), Encyclopedia of Philosophy, Second Edition, vol. 7 (Thomson Gale, 2006), p. 266-267.
 A. Stojković, M. Prvаnović, A. Grubić, Život i delo srpskih nаučnikа, Book 8, ed. Miloje R. Sаrić, Beograd : SANU, 2002, pp. 213–260,

External links
 Full text of the first volume of Petronijević's Principien der Metaphysik (German), on the Internet Archive

1875 births
1954 deaths
20th-century Serbian philosophers
Idealists
Leipzig University alumni
Members of the Serbian Academy of Sciences and Arts
Serbian paleontologists
People from Ub, Serbia
Academic staff of the University of Belgrade
Serbian philosophers
Yugoslav philosophers